Brittany Underwood (born July 6, 1988) is an American actress and singer. She is known for her roles as teenagers Langston Wilde on the daytime soap opera One Life to Live and Loren Tate on the Nick at Nite/TeenNick serial drama Hollywood Heights.

Early life
Brittany Underwood was born on July 6, 1988 in Mountain Lakes, New Jersey. Her mother is Colombian and her father is of English descent. She has an older sister named Brigitte. Underwood speaks fluent Spanish and is a black belt in Tae Kwon Do. She attended Mountain Lakes High School.

In an interview with SOAPnet in 2010, Underwood said she was currently attending Manhattanville College in Purchase, New York. At the college, she researched neuroscience, and such diseases as Alzheimer's disease and Parkinson's disease.

Career
Underwood's first television role was in a 2005 episode of Law & Order: Special Victims Unit. She later auditioned for the title role in the Disney Channel series Hannah Montana, but the role went to Miley Cyrus.

Underwood portrayed Langston Wilde on the ABC Daytime soap opera One Life to Live from 2006 to 2012, a role she originated. In 2012 she starred as Loren Tate on the Nick at Nite/TeenNick serial drama Hollywood Heights. She performed several songs on both series.

Underwood officially began a singing career in 2012. On December 18, 2012, Underwood released a single called "Flow". It and more songs like "Pull Me in Again", "Black Widow", "California Wild", "Love Me Now or Let Me Go", "Shine" and "High Heels High Hopes" all are on her EP in iTunes and YouTube. In 2015, she released a single titled "Not Yet".

In 2014 Underwood played the lead in the television film Death Clique.

Filmography

Discography
 Brittany Underwood (2013)

References

External links

Brittany Underwood at buddytv.com
Brittany Underwood at Twitter

1988 births
Living people
21st-century American actresses
American soap opera actresses
American child actresses
Hispanic and Latino American actresses
Actresses from Newark, New Jersey
American people of Colombian descent
Mountain Lakes High School alumni
People from Mountain Lakes, New Jersey
Musicians from Newark, New Jersey
Manhattanville College alumni